Hel Lighthouse is an active lighthouse in the town of Hel, Pomeranian Voivodeship in Poland.  It is situated at the eastern tip of the Hel Peninsula and guides ship traffic into Gdańsk Bay and the Bay of Puck.

History 
The lighthouse on Hel has its origins in the 16th century when a fire was lit on the church tower at a height of 116 feet to guide ships. The structure burned down. In 1638 locals asked Gdańsk authorities to build a lighthouse on the peninsula. After deliberation, a wooden structure was erected circa 1640, with a range of about 6 miles. In 1667 it burned down, too.

Two further attempts at construction failed as well. However, seafaring in this area of the Baltic remained hazardous, so around 1790 another effort was made. A site was allocated, including a lighthouse-keeper's residence. The light was to be lit every day.

Though effectiveness improved, the lighthouse soon faced the problem of being obscured by growing trees. The construction of the first brick lighthouse started in 1806. Due to civil wars the effort dragged on until 1826.

The brick lighthouse wasn't high enough and ships continued to sink between Jastarnia and Hel. A cannon was placed at the lighthouse, fired every four minutes, as a sound signal. This continued until the gunner died in 1910. A stone commemorates the event to this day.

More improvements followed. The light source switched to a paraffin lamp and the structure was renovated. Electric light was installed in 1938 in the form of a 3000 watt bulb. During World War II Germans decided to take down the structure, since it presented a perfect target for air raids.

In 1942 Germans ordered locals to erect a new lighthouse. It stood 10 meters to the southeast from the old one (now detonated). The new structure was modern, powered by electricity, and it's been in operation to this day.

The 40.8-meter tower is painted red and octagonal in shape. The light source is a 1000 watt bulb, set 38.5 meters above sea level, with a range of 17 miles. The lighthouse is also a part of an air traffic control system.

The lighthouse is a tourist attraction and open to the public during summer. Apart from the lighthouse itself, a few keeper houses remain, dating back to 19th century. Facing west, inland, one can see the Swedish Hill with an old lighthouse built during World War II to replace the one destroyed in Hel at the same time.

Climate

Gallery

See also 

 List of lighthouses in Poland

References

External links 

 The Lighthouses of Poland
 Urząd Morski w Słupsku  
 Hel Lighthouse - Latarnia morska (Hel) na portalu polska-org.pl 
 Hel – Travel guide at Wikivoyage

Lighthouses completed in 1827
Lighthouses in Poland
Puck County
Buildings and structures in Pomeranian Voivodeship
Tourist attractions in Pomeranian Voivodeship
1827 establishments in Prussia